The Open Definition is a document published by the Open Knowledge Foundation (OKF) (previously Open Knowledge International) to define openness in relation to data and content. It specifies what licences for such material may and may not stipulate, in order to be considered open licences. The definition itself was derived from the Open Source Definition for software.

OKI summarise the document as:

The latest form of the document, published in November 2015, is version 2.1. The use of language in the document is conformant with RFC 2119.

The document is available under a Creative Commons Attribution 4.0 International License, which itself meets the Open Definition.

History 

 August 2005: Circulation of the first draft of the Open Definition, v0.1. 
 July 2006: publication of v1.0
 November 2009: publication of v1.1
 October 2014: publication of v2.0
 November 2015: publication of v2.1

See also 
 Berlin Declaration on Open Access to Knowledge in the Sciences and Humanities
 Budapest Open Access Initiative
Definition of Free Cultural Works
 UNESCO 2012 Paris OER Declaration

References

External links 

 
 Why the Open Definition Matters for Open Data, September 2014 blog post by Rufus Pollock, founder and president of OKI

Open data
Open content
2005 documents